The 2022 season was Central Sparks' third season, in which they competed in the 50 over Rachael Heyhoe Flint Trophy and the Twenty20 Charlotte Edwards Cup. In the Charlotte Edwards Cup, the side finished second in Group A, winning four of their six matches and progressing to the semi-final as the best second-placed team. They beat South East Stars by 2 wickets in the semi-final, but lost to Southern Vipers by 6 wickets in the final. Central Sparks wicket-keeper batter Amy Jones was named as Player of the Year in the Charlotte Edwards Cup, and was the tournament's leading run-scorer with 289 runs in 8 matches. The side finished fifth in the Rachael Heyhoe Flint Trophy, winning two of their six matches.
 
The side was captained by Evelyn Jones and coached by Lloyd Tennant. They played four home matches at New Road, two at Edgbaston Cricket Ground and one at Edgbaston Foundation Ground.

Squad

Changes
On 29 October 2021, it was announced that Central Sparks had signed Ami Campbell from Northern Diamonds and Abigail Freeborn from Lightning, and that both players had signed a professional contract. On the same day, it was announced that Marie Kelly had left the side, joining Lightning. The side confirmed their 21-player squad for the season on 9 May 2022, with no further changes. The following day, it was confirmed that Chloe Hill had joined Southern Vipers on loan for the Charlotte Edwards Cup. Hill's loan was later extended for the Rachael Heyhoe Flint Trophy. Gwenan Davies joined Lightning on loan for two matches during the Rachael Heyhoe Flint Trophy. Gabrielle Basketter was added to the squad in September 2022, making her debut for the side on 11 September.

Squad list
 Age given is at the start of Central Sparks' first match of the season (14 May 2022).

Charlotte Edwards Cup

Group A

 advanced to the semi-final

Fixtures

Semi-final

Final

Tournament statistics

Batting

Source: ESPN Cricinfo Qualification: 50 runs.

Bowling

Source: ESPN Cricinfo Qualification: 5 wickets.

Rachael Heyhoe Flint Trophy

Season standings

 advanced to final
 advanced to the play-off

Fixtures

Tournament statistics

Batting

Source: ESPN Cricinfo Qualification: 100 runs.

Bowling

Source: ESPN Cricinfo Qualification: 5 wickets.

Season statistics

Batting

Bowling

Fielding

Wicket-keeping

References

Central Sparks seasons
2022 in English women's cricket